Nordic United FC is a Swedish football club located in Södertälje.

Background
Assyriska Botkyrka FF was founded in 2011 after the shut down of Assyriska FF's reserve team Assyriska FF Ungdom (founded 2008), which was done to many other reserve teams in Sweden, due to changes in loan rules for young players in the country. Before 2008 the club was known as Assyriska Rinkeby IF. Changes in identity have been the norm in recent years with the club being known as Rinkeby AIF up to 2006. Assyriska Botkyrka FF, just as Assyriska FF Ungdom did, cooperated with Assyriska Föreningen.

Since their foundation they have participated in the middle divisions of the Swedish football league system.
In 2013 the club changed its name to Assyriska United IK and relocated to Södertälje.

Assyriska Botkyrka FF are affiliated to the Södermanlands Fotbollförbund.

Recent history
Assyriska FF Ungdom have competed in the following divisions:

2010	– Division III, Östra Svealand
2009	– Division III, Norra Svealand
F
Assyriska Rinkeby IF have competed in the following divisions:

2008	– Division III, Norra Svealand
2007	– Division IV, Stockholm Norra

Rinkeby AIF have competed in the following divisions:

2006	– Division IV, Stockholm Norra
2005	– Division IV, Stockholm Norra

See also
List of Assyrian-Syriac football teams in Sweden

Footnotes

Sport in Stockholm County
Football clubs in Stockholm County
Nordic United FC
Assyrian/Syriac football clubs in Sweden
Association football clubs established in 2011
2011 establishments in Sweden
Diaspora sports clubs